Sovia albipectus is a butterfly in the family Hesperiidae. It was described by Lionel de Nicéville in 1891. It is found in the Indomalayan realm (Burma, Thailand, Laos and Yunnan).

References

External links
Sovia at Markku Savela's Lepidoptera and Some Other Life Forms

Butterflies described in 1891
Hesperiinae